Constantine Jacob Erdman (September 4, 1846 – January 15, 1911) was a Democratic member of the U.S. House of Representatives from Pennsylvania.

Biography
Constantine J. Erdman (grandson of Jacob Erdman) was born in Upper Saucon Township, Pennsylvania, near Allentown, Pennsylvania.  He attended the common schools of the district and a classical school in Quakertown, Pennsylvania.  He graduated from Pennsylvania College in Gettysburg, Pennsylvania, in 1865.  He studied law, was admitted to the bar in 1867 and practiced in Allentown.  He was elected district attorney in 1874.  He served as adjutant of the Fourth Regiment, Pennsylvania National Guard, during the riots at Reading, Pennsylvania, in 1877.

Erdman was elected as a Democrat to the Fifty-third and Fifty-fourth Congresses. He was not a candidate for reelection in 1896. He resumed the practice of law in Allentown. He served as a trustee of Muhlenberg College at Allentown. He was president of the Coplay Cement Manufacturing Co., the Allentown & Coopersburg Turnpike Co., and the Allen Fire Insurance Co. for many years. He died in Allentown in 1911 and was interred in Fairview Cemetery.

Sources

The Political Graveyard

1846 births
1911 deaths
People from Lehigh County, Pennsylvania
Pennsylvania lawyers
Democratic Party members of the United States House of Representatives from Pennsylvania
Gettysburg College alumni
19th-century American politicians
19th-century American lawyers